Darren Smith (born 6 December 1986) is a Scottish footballer who plays for East of Scotland League side Dunbar United F.C. .

Smith, who began his career with Hibernian, signed for Airdrie United in 2007. He was part of the Airdrie side who won the Scottish Challenge Cup in 2008. Smith was dropped by manager Kenny Black soon afterwards, but was recalled when it was announced that Steven McDougall and Joe Cardle had signed pre-contract agreements with Dunfermline.

Smith was released by Airdrie in 2010, and then spent a few months out of the game. He signed for Albion Rovers on a short-term deal in February 2011.

In July 2011, Smith signed for Berwick Rangers.

After leaving Berwick at the end of the 2011–12 season, Smith joined Scottish Junior side Kelty Hearts, then a year later signed for fellow junior club Ballingry Rovers. On 25 July 2014, he moved to another junior club, Bonnyrigg Rose.

In August 2021 Smith joined East of Scotland Premier League side Dunbar United F.C.

Honours
Airdrie United
Scottish Challenge Cup: 2008–09

References

External links 

 Berwick Rangers 2011–12

1986 births
Association football midfielders
Hibernian F.C. players
Airdrieonians F.C. players
Albion Rovers F.C. players
Berwick Rangers F.C. players
Kelty Hearts F.C. players
Ballingry Rovers F.C. players
Bonnyrigg Rose Athletic F.C. players
Living people
Footballers from Edinburgh
Scottish Football League players
Scottish Junior Football Association players
Scottish footballers